Guenter Bluff is a prominent rock bluff on the west side of Pomerantz Tableland, in the Usarp Mountains of Antarctica. It was mapped by the United States Geological Survey from surveys and U.S. Navy aerial photographs, 1960–62, and was named by the Advisory Committee on Antarctic Names for Clarence A. Guenter, a United States Antarctic Research Program worker in the field of physiopsychology at South Pole Station, 1967–68.

References

Cliffs of Oates Land